Renty Taylor (-after 1865), also known as Renty Thompson or Papa Renty, was an African man of the 18th and 19th centuries. Born in the Congo Basin, he was captured and enslaved and brought to the United States and sold as a slave. He worked on the cotton plantation owned by Benjamin Franklin Taylor. He was one of the subjects of the oldest known slave photos, which were taken by Joseph T. Zealy under the supervision of Harvard biologist Louis Agassiz in March 1850, whose ideas were used to support the enslavement of Africans in the United States and promote white supremacy.

Biography
Renty Taylor was born around 1775 in the Congo; his birth name is today unknown. He was captured by slave traders and arrived in New Orleans on a Spanish slave ship around 1800. He was eventually purchased by Col. Thomas Taylor (1743–1833) during the early 1800s and he eventually made his way to the "Edgehill" plantation at Columbia, South Carolina. Renty Taylor was proud of his African roots and he taught himself to read despite laws against it and taught it to other African-American slaves. Reading would have been risky, even dangerous, for slaves because of Anti-literacy laws in the United States.

In March 1850, Louis Agassiz commissioned daguerreotypes, described as "haunting and voyeuristic" of the enslaved Renty Taylor and Taylor's daughter Delia to further his arguments about black inferiority. They are the earliest known photographs of slaves. Agassiz left the images to Harvard and they remained in the Peabody Museum’s attic until 1976 when they were re-discovered by Ellie Reichlin. 

In 1852, Renty and his daughter's names appeared on a probate inventory of Benjamin Franklin Taylor's slaves. He eventually took on the name Renty Taylor sometime after the American Civil War ended in 1865. It is unknown when he died and it is also unknown if he was ever freed, although he disappeared from records around three years after Abraham Lincoln had passed the Emancipation Proclamation.

Lawsuit 
In 2019, Taylor's descendants sued Harvard for the return of the images and unspecified damages. The lawsuit was supported by forty-three living descendants of Louis Agassiz, they wrote a letter of support that read in part "For Harvard to give the daguerreotypes to Ms. Lanier and her family would begin to make amends for its use of the photos as exhibits for the white supremacist theory Agassiz espoused”, and that everyone must evaluate fully "his role in promoting a pseudoscientific justification for white supremacy." Asked what she would do with the images if she won the case, Tamara Lanier, Renty Taylor's great-great-great granddaughter stated: "I know that this is something that should be in the public domain, and Harvard should not be profiting from the use of these images, and beyond that, it's a matter of dignity and restoring the dignity to Renty."

Lanier v. Harvard was dismissed in 2021, on multiple grounds, including the common law principle that the subject of a photograph holds no property rights in the photo.  Lanier appealed shortly afterwards.

Documentary 
The World Is Watching: Woman Suing Harvard for Photos of Enslaved Ancestors Says History Is At Stake (Video-Interview with Tamara Lanier, the great-great-great-granddaughter of Papa Renty), Democracy Now!, 29 March 2019

References 

19th-century American slaves
1770s births
Year of birth uncertain
Year of death unknown